Liza Johnson (born December 13, 1970) is an American film director, producer, and writer.

Biography
Johnson was born in Portsmouth, Ohio, in 1970. She attended Williams College in Williamstown, Massachusetts, graduating with a B.A. in Visual Arts in 1992. She then went to the University of California, San Diego, where she received her MFA in 1995.

Her narrative shorts and experimental videos have screened in Berlin, Rotterdam, and many other international festivals and fine arts venues. Her video installations have been shown in Artists Space in New York, the ICA in Philadelphia, Cineboords in Rotterdam, and Mass MoCA and WCMA in Massachusetts. She has also published critical writing on art and film, and has curated a number of museum exhibitions and festival programs. Along with her collection of short films, Johnson has directed four feature films, including Return (2011), Hateship, Loveship (2013), and Elvis & Nixon (2016).

Filmography 
Short films
 Giftwrap (1998)
 Falling (2004)
 Desert Motel (2005)
 South of Ten (2006) (Documentary short)
 In the Air (2009)
 Karrabing! Low Tide Turning (2012)

Feature films
 Fernweh – The Opposite of Homesick (2000)
 Return (2011)
 Hateship, Loveship (2013)
 Elvis & Nixon (2016)

Television

References

External links
 
 

1970 births
American women film directors
Living people
Williams College alumni
American film directors
People from Portsmouth, Ohio
21st-century American women